Charles Marvin "Pop" Smith (October 12, 1856 – April 18, 1927) was a Canadian Major League Baseball player from Digby, Nova Scotia, Canada. He played as an infielder for 10 teams over his 12-year career, spanning from 1880 to 1891.

On April 17, 1890, Smith became the first player to go to the plate six times and not have an official at-bat. He received five walks and was hit by the pitch his last plate appearance.

Smith died in Boston, Massachusetts, at the age of 70, and was buried in Brighton's Evergreen Cemetery. In 2005, he was inducted into the Canadian Baseball Hall of Fame.

See also
List of Major League Baseball annual triples leaders

References

External links

SABR Biographical Project

1856 births
1927 deaths
19th-century baseball players
Canadian Baseball Hall of Fame inductees
Major League Baseball second basemen
Major League Baseball players from Canada
Cincinnati Reds (1876–1879) players
Cleveland Blues (NL) players
Buffalo Bisons (NL) players
Worcester Ruby Legs players
Philadelphia Athletics (AA) players
Louisville Eclipse players
Columbus Buckeyes players
Pittsburgh Alleghenys players
Boston Beaneaters players
Washington Statesmen players
Minor league baseball managers
Binghamton Crickets (1870s) players
Utica (minor league baseball) players
Springfield (minor league baseball) players
Omaha Lambs players
Atlanta Firecrackers players
St. Paul Saints (Western League) players
Fort Wayne (minor league baseball) players
Binghamton Bingoes players
Erie Blackbirds players
Providence Grays (minor league) players
Rochester Browns players
Toronto Canucks players
Binghamton Crickets (1880s) players
Batavia Giants players
Geneva Alhambras players
London Cockneys players
Fitchburg (minor league baseball) players
Lawrence (minor league baseball) players
Canadian expatriate baseball players in the United States
Baseball people from Nova Scotia
People from Digby County, Nova Scotia
Canadian people of British descent